PNE can be used to abbreviate the subatomic particles, Proton, Neutron and Electron, when referring to them en masse.

PNE as an acronym could refer to:

Pacific National Exhibition, an exhibition in Vancouver, British Columbia
Preston North End F.C., an English football club based in Preston, Lancashire
Peaceful nuclear explosion, a nuclear explosive set off for peaceful reasons, such as Operation Plowshare
Penge East railway station, London, National Rail station code PNE
Pudendal nerve entrapment
PNe, planetary nebula
Parokya ni Edgar, a Filipino rock band
The IATA airport code of Northeast Philadelphia Airport
North-East Project, Italian political party based in Veneto